Jodi Kustiawan (born 15 May 1992) is an Indonesian professional footballer who plays as a centre-back for Liga 2 club PSIM Yogyakarta.

Club career

PSIM Yogyakarta
In 2021, Jodi signed a contract with Indonesian Liga 2 club PSIM Yogyakarta. He made his league debut on 26 September in a 1–0 loss against PSCS Cilacap.

Honours

Club 
PSS Sleman
 Liga 2: 2018

References

External links
 Jodi Kustiawan at Soccerway
 Jodi Kustiawan at Liga Indonesia

1992 births
Living people
Indonesian footballers
Persela Lamongan players
Association football defenders
People from Ngawi Regency
Sportspeople from East Java